October 7 - Eastern Orthodox liturgical calendar - October 9

All fixed commemorations below celebrated on October 21 by Eastern Orthodox Churches on the Old Calendar.

For October 8th, Orthodox Churches on the Old Calendar commemorate the Saints listed on September 25.

Saints
 Hieromartyr Artemon, a priest at Laodicea (c. 283-305)
 Virgin-martyr Pelagia of Antioch (303)
 Venerable Thaïs of Egypt (Taisia), repentant courtesan (4th century)
 Venerable Pelagia the Penitent, of the Mount of Olives (457)

Pre-Schism Western saints
 Martyrs Palatias and Laurentia, in Fermo near Ancona, Italy (302)
 Saint Keyne (Keyna, Keyne, Ceinwen), hermitess of Cornwall (5th century)
 Saint Evodus, Bishop of Rouen in France (5th century)
 Saint Benedicta, a virgin-martyr in Laon in France.
 Saint Gratus, Bishop of Châlons-sur-Saône in France (c. 652)
 Saint Badilo, a monk at Vézelay Abbey in France, he became Abbot of Leuze in Hainault in Belgium (c. 870)
 Saint Peter of Seville, a martyr venerated in Seville in Spain.
 Saint Amor of Aquitaine, hermit, rebuilder of Munsterbilzen Abbey (9th century)
 Saint Triduana (Tredwall, Trallen), nun of Restalrig, Scotland (4th century or 8th century)
 St. Iwig (Iwi, Ywi) Hierodeacon of Lindisfarne (c. 690)

Post-Schism Orthodox saints
 Saint Anthony of Novgorod, Archbishop of Novgorod (1232) 
 Venerable Dositheus of Verkhneostrov in Pskov (1482)
 Saint Tryphon of Vyatka, Archimandrite (1612)
 New Monk-martyr Ignatius of Bulgaria and Mt. Athos, at Constantinople (1814)

New Martys and Confessors
 Monk-martyr Varlaam (Efimov) (end of 1930)
 New Hieromartyrs (1937):
 Demetrius (Dobroserdov), Archbishop of Mozhaisk;
 Ambrose (Astakhov), Archimandrite, of Aksinyino, Moscow;
 Pachomius (Turkevich), Abbot, of Moscow;
 John Khrenov, Deacon;
 Nun-martyr Tatiana (Besfamilnov); 
 Martyrs Nicholas Reyin, Maria Vonukhina, and Nadezhda (Hope) Azhgerevich. 
 New Hieromartyr Jonah (Lazarev), Bishop of Nevel, Pskov (1937)
 New Hieromartyr Seraphim Schelokov (1937)
 New Hieromartyrs Peter Nicotin, Basil Ozeretskovsky, Paul Preobrazhensky, Peter Ozeretskovsky, Vladimir Speransky, Priests (1937)
 Martyrs Victor Frolov, John Rybin, Nicholas Kuzmin (1937)
 Virgin-martyr Elizabeth Kuranov (1937)

Other commemorations
 Translation of the relics of St. Aidan, Bishop of Lindisfarne and Enlightener of Northumbria.
 Translation of the relics of St. Ceolfrith, Abbot of Wearmouth and Jarrow.
 Synaxis of the Saints of Vyatka.

Icon gallery

Notes

References

Sources 
 October 8/21. Orthodox Calendar (PRAVOSLAVIE.RU).
 October 21 / October 8. HOLY TRINITY RUSSIAN ORTHODOX CHURCH (A parish of the Patriarchate of Moscow).
 October 8. OCA - The Lives of the Saints.
 The Autonomous Orthodox Metropolia of Western Europe and the Americas (ROCOR). St. Hilarion Calendar of Saints for the year of our Lord 2004. St. Hilarion Press (Austin, TX). p. 75.
 The Eighth Day of the Month of October. Orthodoxy in China.
 October 8. Latin Saints of the Orthodox Patriarchate of Rome.
 The Roman Martyrology. Transl. by the Archbishop of Baltimore. Last Edition, According to the Copy Printed at Rome in 1914. Revised Edition, with the Imprimatur of His Eminence Cardinal Gibbons. Baltimore: John Murphy Company, 1916. pp. 310–311.
 Rev. Richard Stanton. A Menology of England and Wales, or, Brief Memorials of the Ancient British and English Saints Arranged According to the Calendar, Together with the Martyrs of the 16th and 17th Centuries. London: Burns & Oates, 1892. pp. 478–480.
Greek Sources
 Great Synaxaristes:  8 ΟΚΤΩΒΡΙΟΥ. ΜΕΓΑΣ ΣΥΝΑΞΑΡΙΣΤΗΣ.
  Συναξαριστής. 8 Οκτωβρίου. ECCLESIA.GR. (H ΕΚΚΛΗΣΙΑ ΤΗΣ ΕΛΛΑΔΟΣ).
  08/10/2017. Ορθόδοξος Συναξαριστής. 
Russian Sources
  21 октября (8 октября). Православная Энциклопедия под редакцией Патриарха Московского и всея Руси Кирилла (электронная версия). (Orthodox Encyclopedia - Pravenc.ru).
  8 октября по старому стилю / 21 октября по новому стилю. Русская Православная Церковь - Православный церковный календарь на 2016 год.

October in the Eastern Orthodox calendar